Kylie Percival is an Australian archivist. She is an Associate University Librarian at the University of Adelaide and former president of the Australian Society of Archivists.

Career
After graduating from University, Percival was hired as an archivist in government, school and private company archives. In 1988, she joined the Australian Society of Archivists (ASA), and worked in various roles such as past conference organiser and Convenor of the South Australian Branch. As Convenor of the South Australian Branch, Percival helped fight against the closure of archives in Darwin, Adelaide and Hobart. By 1994, Percival began her archiving career at the University of Adelaide Archives.

In 2011, Percival became Vice-President of the ASA National Council, where she was subsequently elected President the following year. She held the role of president until 2016, where she was then presented with the Distinguished Achievement Award by the ASA. Two years later, Percival was appointed Associate University Librarian of Academic Engagement at the University of Adelaide.

References 

Living people
Female archivists
21st-century Australian women
21st-century Australian people
20th-century Australian women
Year of birth missing (living people)